Pashai or Pashayi may refer to:
Pashayi people
Pashayi language
Pashai, Iran, a village in Golestan Province, Iran

Language and nationality disambiguation pages